Steve Barnes (born July 19, 1970) is a Canadian former professional ice hockey defenceman.

Barnes attended Lake Superior State University where he played NCAA college hockey from 1990 to 1994 with the Lake Superior State Lakers, scoring 16 goals and 96 assists for 112 points while earning 14 penalty minutes in 169 games played.

Barnes went on to play six years of professional hockey, including the 1996–97 season when he won the BH Cup as a member of the Manchester Storm. He retired following the 1999–2000 season spent with the Port Huron Border Cats of the United Hockey League.

Awards and honours

References

External links

1970 births
Living people
Canadian ice hockey defencemen
Huntington Blizzard players
Lake Superior State Lakers men's ice hockey players
People from Gravenhurst, Ontario
Port Huron Border Cats players
Toledo Storm players
Ice hockey people from Ontario
NCAA men's ice hockey national champions